The Yukon Men's Curling Championship is the men's territorial championship for men's curling in the Yukon. Beginning in 2015, the event serves as a direct qualifier to the Tim Hortons Brier, Canada's national men's curling championships. Prior to 2015, the event served as a qualifier for the Yukon/NWT Men's Curling Championship.

Winners (2015–present)

Winners (up to 2015)
The following teams won the Yukon playdowns for the Territorial men's curling championship. These teams were known as "Yukon #1" at the Territories championships. The runner up team also qualified for the territorial championship and was known as "Yukon #2".

References

The Brier provincial tournaments
Curling in Yukon